Rick Egloff (born c. 1945) is an American  former a gridiron football player who played professionally in the Canadian Football League (CFL).

A graduate of Mullen High School in Denver, Egloff played college football at the University of Wyoming in Laramie, where he starred as a quarterback from 1964 to 1966.

In the 1967 NFL/AFL Draft, Egloff was selected by the Oakland Raiders of the American Football League in the sixth round (155th overall), then traded to the Denver Broncos in April 1968, but did not play with either team. In , he played four games with the Montreal Alouettes of the Canadian Football League.

He now resides in the foothills of Colorado where he runs an Italian restaurant.

References

Year of birth missing (living people)
Living people
American football quarterbacks
American players of Canadian football
Montreal Alouettes players
Wyoming Cowboys football players
Players of American football from Denver